Comet Bradfield or C/2004 F4 is a long-period comet discovered on 23 March 2004, by New Zealand-Australian amateur astronomer William Ashley Bradfield. Its flyby of the Sun was also observed by the SOHO space telescope.

References 

 

Astronomical objects discovered in 2004
Comets
Discoveries by amateur astronomers